Aarthi Puri, also known as Arthi Puri, (born 8 January) is an Indian television & movie actress and model. Noted roles include the character of Trishna from show Madhubala - Ek Ishq Ek Junoon. and movies like Deswa.

Career
Puri started her career with regional cinema and then moved on to small screen. She is a model and has also done many movies and 100+ plus Punjabi videos as model as well. She was cast to play the parallel lead in the show Madhubala - Ek Ishq Ek Junoon. alongside Drashti Dhami, who plays the lead in the show. She also played a lead role opposite Rakesh Kapoor in, "Pahado Ke Daman Mein"  in 1999.

Regional Film
Khich Ghuggi Khich (Punjabi comedy),
Nalaik (2005)

Television 
2012–2013 Madhubala - Ek Ishq Ek Junoon as Trishna Balraj Chaudhary

Filmography 
2004 Mysteries Shaque as Simran
2013 Ramaiya Vastavaiya as Gauri
2014 Action Jackson
2015 Addam lo Deyyam (telugu)

References

External links
 
 

Living people
Actresses from Lucknow
Female models from Uttar Pradesh
Indian film actresses
Indian television actresses
Actresses in Hindi cinema
Actresses in Bhojpuri cinema
Actresses in Hindi television
Year of birth missing (living people)